Barbara Jean Sowers (May 4, 1932 – October 19, 2012) was an All-American Girls Professional Baseball League player who played for the Muskegon Belles in 1953 and the Grand Rapids Chicks in 1954.

In 1953, the outfielder hit .205 with 34 hits in 70 games and the next year, she hit .284 with 56 hits and 34 RBI in 70 games. Overall, she hit .248 in 140 career games.

She was born in Detroit, Michigan and died in Port Charlotte, Florida at the age of 80.  She was born May 4, 1932 in Detroit, Michigan to the late Carl and Luella (née LaRocque) Sowers. A career public educator and High School Counselor, Barbara moved with her longtime companion Shirley A. Weaver from their hometown of Livonia, Michigan, to Charlotte County Florida in 1989 following her retirement.

References

All-American Girls Professional Baseball League players
1932 births
2012 deaths
Muskegon Belles players
21st-century American women